The International School of Sanya (TIS;  or ) is an international school in the Serenity Coast area of Sanya, Hainan. It serves levels nursery through grade 12. There are currently three streams: a Nursery-Grade 12 international stream (TIS); an English/Chinese (50/50) program with American curriculum (SLS); and the Nursery-Grade 12 Chinese stream ("local"), a program using Chinese curriculum. Its campus has  of space. Its governing organization is called Haiya Education Group, which own the TIS campus (and attached kindergarten "SLS-K"), and another kindergarten campus, "Golden Sun Kindergarten".

Originally the Canadian International School of Sanya (CIS), it was Sanya's first ever international school, opening in September 2013. It previously occupied four buildings in a  campus in the Chunguang (春光, "Spring Light") neighborhood. It opened during an effort by the Hainan government to attract more foreign tourists and residents.

See also

 Canadians in China

References

Further reading
 "International school to be  in Sanya in the near future" (Archive). City of Sanya. September 2011.

External links
 The International School of Sanya
  The International School of Sanya
 Canadian International School of Sanya (Archive)

Sanya
Education in Hainan
Canadian international schools in China
Educational institutions established in 2014
2014 establishments in China